Paul John Kvale (March 27, 1896 – June 14, 1960) was a U.S. Representative from Minnesota.

Early life
Kvale who was born in Orfordville, Wisconsin as the son of Ole J. Kvale. He attended the Orfordville school and the University of Illinois. In 1917, he moved to Benson, Minnesota with his parents. Kvale was graduated from Luther College in Decorah, Iowa, in 1917 and served in the United States Army during the First World War as a sergeant in a machine gun corps, from September 7, 1917, to August 4, 1919.

After the war, he became a student at the University of Minnesota at Minneapolis in 1919 and 1920, after which he returned to and engaged as editor of the Swift County News in 1920 and 1921. In 1921, he became staff editor of the Minneapolis Tribune.

Political career
From 1922 to 1929, Kvale served as secretary to his father, who was a member of the United States Congress. After his father's death, he was elected as a Farmer-Labor candidate to the 71st congress to fill the vacancy. Kvale was re-elected to the 72nd, 73rd, 74th, and 75th congresses, and served from October 16, 1929, to January 3, 1939. His run for reelection in 1938 to the 76th congress was unsuccessful.

On June 14, 1960, Kvale died in Minneapolis, Minnesota. He was interred at the Protestant Cemetery in Swift County, Minnesota. Asked how to say his name, Kvale told The Literary Digest: "Pronounced qually, rhymes with golly."

References

Other sources

1960 deaths
People from Orfordville, Wisconsin
Members of the United States House of Representatives from Minnesota
American Lutherans
American people of Norwegian descent
1896 births
University of Minnesota alumni
Minnesota Farmer–Laborites
Luther College (Iowa) alumni
Farmer–Labor Party members of the United States House of Representatives
20th-century American politicians
People from Benson, Minnesota
20th-century Lutherans
Military personnel from Minnesota
United States Army personnel of World War I
United States Army non-commissioned officers